No Angels is a British comedy-drama television series, produced by the independent production company World Productions for Channel 4, which ran for three series from 2004 to 2006. It was devised by Toby Whithouse.

Premise
The programme centres on the lives of three nurses and a healthcare assistant in the city of Leeds. The four main characters are Kate Oakley (played by Kaye Wragg), Lia Costoya (Louise Delamere), Anji Mittel (Sunetra Sarker), and Beth Nicholls (Jo Joyner). Additional main characters were played by Derek Riddell, James Frost, Francis Magee and Matt Bardock. The show deals with the women's lives both in and out of the hospital.

Cast
 Louise Delamere as Lia Costoya - A nurse (and acting ward sister in Series One) at the hospital. She is a single mother; her daughter Emma lives with her father. Lia lives in hospital accommodation with Anji, Kate and Beth and attended college with Kate Oakley. The two subsequently became best friends.  Lia has a sharp attitude and is often described as being a "great nurse, but a terrible mother." At the end of Series 3, Emma asks to move in with Lia and they begin to search for a flat. Shortly afterwards, Jamie, with whom Lia was in a relationship until he relocated to Australia, returns to Leeds and they get back together.
 Kaye Wragg as Katherine 'Kate' Oakley - A nurse and, later, ward sister at the hospital. Kate has several relationships throughout the programmes, including one with Dr Jamie Patterson. She later accepts Peter Compton's proposal in Series 3, but after he makes numerous attempts to control her, she eventually leaves him at the altar in the show's final episode. Kate went to an all-girls school and had a horse called Treacle and it is therefore assumed that she was relatively well off. However, she craves attention from her mother.
 Sunetra Sarker as Anji Mittel - A health care assistant (HCA) at the hospital. She is known for her numerous relationships and one night stands. In the first series, she is engaged (by an arranged marriage) to Adjesh, but he later rejects her after he falls in love. After declining a nursing course and being rejected by Callum, Anji decides to go travelling, returning in Series 3 heavily pregnant. She later gives birth to a baby girl and begins dating Callum after he declares his love for her. At Kate's wedding she decides to name her baby girl Mia. Anji is Beth's best friend. She has two sisters who are both married dentists, but she doesn't really get on with her family.
 Jo Joyner as Beverly Elizabeth 'Beth' Nicholls - A nurse at the hospital. She openly admits that she'd rather have money than love in the first series and begins an affair with one of the hospital's senior management. However, after he leaves his wife, Beth dumps him, admitting that she needs something more than "I will love you". She continues to date men for their money, but clearly doesn't like being treated like a "trophy wife". In the final series she begins dating a plumber (ironically as for 3 seasons she stated that she 'didn't do' plumbers).  Beth, like Kate and Lia, has also slept with Jamie. Beth was raised by her aunt and it is implied that she left home for an unknown reason, although it is hinted in the same episode that she was molested/raped by her male cousin in the fourth episode of series one - something that by the end of the episode is suspected by her Aunt.
 Francis Magee as Mr. Leslie McManus - The senior consultant on the ward. He has a fierce temper.
 Derek Riddell as Dr. Jamie Patterson - McManus' golden boy.  He has had both a short term relationship and a fling with Kate, and has slept with Beth. At the end of series three he reconciles with long term girlfriend Lia after his return from Australia, where he admits that he loves her.
 James Frost as Dr. Callum Parker - McManus' House Officer in the series. He is a reluctant doctor, having trained just to appease his parents. His true passion is golf, at which he is excellent - a passion he leaves medicine to pursue in series 2, but he later returns to the hospital. He is very shy and unassertive, something Anji tries to help him with, however it is revealed when he begins a relationship with physiotherapist Daisy that he is extremely sexually talented. In series 3 he declares his love for Anji, and they begin a relationship.
 Charlotte Leach as Emma - Lia's daughter. She lives with her father and step-mother, Sally.  At the end of series 3 she asks to live with Lia, as she finds Sally too controlling and would prefer to be with her mum.
 Lynn Ferguson as Stella

Decommission

On 19 August 2005, Channel 4 announced that the show was to end after a third and final series. Newly appointed drama commissioner at the station Francis Hopkinson decided to cancel the show after the eight episodes of Series 3 had aired. He stated "All the characters have moved on..I didn't like the idea of starting again with new characters so we're ending it while it's on top." Channel 4 said that by ending the series they were able to focus more on issue-based dramas.

Filming

The filming for all three series of the show took place mainly at the disused High Royds Hospital site in nearby Menston. Most other filming took place in Leeds city centre and Bradford.

Further reading
 Allen, Daniel (25 February 2004). "No holds barred". Nursing Standard (RCN Publishing Company) 18 (24): 14–15.

References

External links
 
 

2004 British television series debuts
2006 British television series endings
2000s British comedy-drama television series
2000s British medical television series
2000s British sex comedy television series
2000s British workplace comedy television series
2000s British workplace drama television series
Channel 4 comedy dramas
English-language television shows
Television shows set in Leeds
Television series by World Productions